A number of steamships were named Penelope, including:

, a Norwegian and Finnish cargo ship in service 1946–72
, a Liberian cargo ship in service 1956–64

Ship names